Stanislav Hofmann (born 17 June 1990) is a Czech professional footballer who plays as a centre-back for Czech club Slovácko.

Club career
Hofmann is a youth product of his local club Baník Most since the age of 5, and began his senior career with them in 2008. He transferred to the Czech First League club Slovácko in 18 May 2012. He was on loan with Baník Sokolov from 2013 to 2015, before returning to Slovácko where he became a consistent starter. He extended the contract with the club on 22 June 2021 after 9 seasons with the club. Hofmann helped the club Slovácko win their first domestic trophy ever, the 2021–22 Czech Cup, where he assisted his side's second goal in a 3–1 win on 18 May 2022. As of October 2022, he is 4th all-time in appearances for Slovácko with 197 appearances.

International career
Hofmann played for the youth international teams up to the Czech Republic U20s.

Personal life
Hofmann married his wife Libuše in June 2018, and has 2 children.

Honours
Slovácko
 Czech Cup: 2021–22

References

External links
 
 
 Fotball.cz Profile
 iDNES Profile

1990 births
Living people
People from Most District
Czech footballers
Czech Republic youth international footballers
Association football defenders
Czech First League players
Czech National Football League players
FK Baník Most players
1. FC Slovácko players
FK Baník Sokolov players